NJPS may refer to:

 National Jewish Population Survey
 New Jewish Publication Society of America Version